4000 (four thousand) is the natural number following 3999 and preceding 4001. It is a decagonal number.

Selected numbers in the range 4001–4999

4001 to 4099
 4005 – triangular number
 4007 – safe prime
 4010 – magic constant of n × n normal magic square and n-queens problem for n = 20.
 4013 – balanced prime
 4019 – Sophie Germain prime
 4027 – super-prime
 4028 – sum of the first 45 primes
 4030 – third weird number
 4031 – sum of the cubes of the first six primes
 4032 – pronic number
 4033 – sixth super-Poulet number; strong pseudoprime in base 2
 4060 – tetrahedral number
 4073 – Sophie Germain prime
 4079 – safe prime
 4091 – super-prime
 4092 – an occasional glitch in the game The Legend of Zelda: Ocarina of Time causes the Gossip Stones to say this number
 4095 – triangular number and odd abundant number; number of divisors in the sum of the fifth and largest known unitary perfect number, largest Ramanujan–Nagell number of the form .
 4096 = 642 = 163 = 84 = 46 = 212, the smallest number with exactly 13 divisors, a superperfect number

4100 to 4199
 4104 = 23 + 163 = 93 + 153
 4127 – safe prime
 4133 – super-prime
 4139 – safe prime
 4140 – Bell number
 4141 – centered square number
 4147 – smallest cyclic number in duodecimal represented in base-12 notation as 249712.2×4147dez = 4972123×4147dez = 7249124×4147dez = 972412
 4153 – super-prime
 4160 – pronic number
 4166 – centered heptagonal number,
 4167 = 7! − 6! − 5! − 4! − 3! − 2! − 1!, number of planar partitions of 14
 4169 – a number of points of norm n </= n in cubic lattice 
 4177 – prime of the form 2p-1
 4181 – Fibonacci number, Markov number
 4186 – triangular number
 4187 – factor of R13, also the record number of wickets taken in first-class cricket by Wilfred Rhodes.
 4199 – highly cototient number, product of three consecutive primes

4200 to 4299
 4200 – nonagonal number, pentagonal pyramidal number,
 4210 – 11th semi-meandric number
 4211 – Sophie Germain prime
 4213 – Riordan number
 4217 – super-prime, happy number
 4219 – cuban prime of the form x = y + 1, centered hexagonal number
 4225 = 652, centered octagonal number
 4227 – sum of the first 46 primes
 4240 – Leyland number
 4257 – decagonal number
 4259 – safe prime
 4261 – prime of the form 2p-1
 4271 – Sophie Germain prime
 4273 – super-prime, number of non-isomorphic set-systems of weight 11
 4278 – triangular number
 4279 – little Schroeder number
 4283 – safe prime
 4289 – highly cototient number
 4290 – pronic number

4300 to 4399
 4324 – 23rd square pyramidal number
 4325 – centered square number
 4339 – super-prime, twin prime
 4349 – Sophie Germain prime
 4356 = 662, sum of the cubes of the first eleven integers
 4357 – prime of the form 2p-1
 4359 – perfect totient number
 4369 – seventh super-Poulet number
 4371 – triangular number
 4373 – Sophie Germain prime
 4374 – 3-smooth number (2×37)
 4375 – perfect totient number (the smallest not divisible by 3)
 4391 – Sophie Germain prime
 4397 – Year of Comet Hale–Bopp's return, super-prime

4400 to 4499
 4400 – the number of missing persons in the sci-fi show The 4400
 4409 – Sophie Germain prime, highly cototient number, balanced prime, 600th prime number
 4410 – member of the Padovan sequence
 4411 – centered heptagonal number
 4421 – super-prime, alternating factorial
 4422 – pronic number
 4425 = 15 + 25 + 35 + 45 + 55
 4438 – sum of the first 47 primes
 4446 – nonagonal number
 4447 – cuban prime of the form x = y + 1
 4457 – balanced prime
 4463 – super-prime
 4465 – triangular number
 4481 – Sophie Germain prime
 4489 = 672, centered octagonal number
 4495 – tetrahedral number

4500 to 4599
 4503 – largest number not the sum of four or fewer squares of composites
 4505 – fifth Zeisel number
 4513 – centered square number
 4516 – centered pentagonal number
 4517 – super-prime, happy number
 4522 – decagonal number
 4547 – safe prime
 4549 – super-prime
 4556 – pronic number
 4560 – triangular number
 4567 – super-prime
 4579 – octahedral number
 4597 – balanced prime

4600 to 4699
 4607 – Woodall number
 4608 – 3-smooth number (29×32)
 4619 – highly cototient number
 4621 – prime of the form 2p-1
 4624 = 682
 4641 – magic constant of n × n normal magic square and n-queens problem for n = 21.
 4655 – number of free decominoes
 4656 – triangular number
 4657 – balanced prime
 4661 – sum of the first 48 primes
 4663 – super-prime, centered heptagonal number
 4679 – safe prime
 4681 – eighth super-Poulet number
 4688 – 2-automorphic number
 4689 – sum of divisors and number of divisors are both triangular numbers
 4691 – balanced prime
 4692 – pronic number
 4699 – nonagonal number

4700 to 4799
 4703 – safe prime
 4705 = 482 + 492 = 172 + 182 + ... + 262, centered square number
 4727 – sum of the squares of the first twelve primes
 4731 – centered pentagonal number
 4733 – Sophie Germain prime
 4753 – triangular number
 4759 – super-prime
 4761 = 692, centered octagonal number
 4769 = number of square (0,1)-matrices without zero rows and with exactly 5 entries equal to 1.
 4787 – safe prime, super-prime
 4788 – 14th Keith number
 4793 – Sophie Germain prime
 4795 – decagonal number
 4799 – safe prime

4800 to 4899
 4801 – super-prime, cuban prime of the form x = y + 2, smallest prime with a composite sum of digits in base 7
 4830 – pronic number
 4840 - square yards in an acre
 4851 – triangular number, pentagonal pyramidal number
 4862 – Catalan number
 4871 – Sophie Germain prime
 4877 – super-prime
 4879 – 11th Kaprekar number
 4888 – sum of the first 49 primes

4900 to 4999
 4900 = 702, the only square-pyramidal square other than 1
 4901 – centered square number
 4913 = 173
 4919 – Sophie Germain prime, safe prime
 4922 – centered heptagonal number
 4933 – super-prime
 4941 – centered cube number
 4943 – Sophie Germain prime, super-prime
 4950 – triangular number, 12th Kaprekar number
 4951 – centered pentagonal number
 4957 – sum of three and five consecutive primes (1637 + 1657 + 1663, 977 + 983 + 991 + 997 + 1009)
 4959 – nonagonal number
 4960 – tetrahedral number; greater of fourth pair of Smith brothers
 4970 – pronic number
 4973 – the 666th prime
 4991 – Lucas–Carmichael number
 4993 – balanced prime
 4999 – prime of the form

Prime numbers
There are 119 prime numbers between 4000 and 5000:
4001, 4003, 4007, 4013, 4019, 4021, 4027, 4049, 4051, 4057, 4073, 4079, 4091, 4093, 4099, 4111, 4127, 4129, 4133, 4139, 4153, 4157, 4159, 4177, 4201, 4211, 4217, 4219, 4229, 4231, 4241, 4243, 4253, 4259, 4261, 4271, 4273, 4283, 4289, 4297, 4327, 4337, 4339, 4349, 4357, 4363, 4373, 4391, 4397, 4409, 4421, 4423, 4441, 4447, 4451, 4457, 4463, 4481, 4483, 4493, 4507, 4513, 4517, 4519, 4523, 4547, 4549, 4561, 4567, 4583, 4591, 4597, 4603, 4621, 4637, 4639, 4643, 4649, 4651, 4657, 4663, 4673, 4679, 4691, 4703, 4721, 4723, 4729, 4733, 4751, 4759, 4783, 4787, 4789, 4793, 4799, 4801, 4813, 4817, 4831, 4861, 4871, 4877, 4889, 4903, 4909, 4919, 4931, 4933, 4937, 4943, 4951, 4957, 4967, 4969, 4973, 4987, 4993, 4999

References

Integers